Thomas Walker (December 15, 1850 - May 28, 1935) was enslaved before becoming a state legislator, county clerk, and deputy sheriff. He served in the Alabama House of Representatives.

Samuel M. Hill was his father. His mother was enslaved.

He gave sworn testimony in Bromberg v. Haralson.

References

1850 births
1935 deaths
American freedmen
Alabama sheriffs
African-American state legislators in Alabama
Members of the Alabama House of Representatives